Ayatollah Haydar al-Sadr (1891–1937) was born in Samarra, Iraq. His father, Ismail as-Sadr (d. 1920) was a Grand Ayatollah and the first to be use the as-Sadr surname, which came to be associated with a long line of religious scholarship within Shia Islam. Haydar and the as-Sadr family are also considered as Sayyid, or those who can trace their lineage back to Muhammad (d. 632). The family's lineage is traced through Imam Jafar al-Sadiq and his son Imam Musa al-Kazim the sixth and seventh Shia Imams respectively. This direct and meticulously documented lineage is unprecedented even among the illustrious families in the Islamic world who claim such lineage. The Shia Muslims consider themselves the followers of Muhammad's bloodline, thus a great deal of respect and reverence is paid to the Sayyids throughout society. Some of the well known relatives of Haydar al-Sadr include his brother, Sadr al-Din Sadr (d. 1954), his nephew Moussa as-Sadr and another nephew Mohammad Sadeq al-Sadr.

Haydar was considered a grand marja at-taqlid (supreme religious authority) of his time. A marja' at-taqlīd, literally, means "reference point for emulation", or one who through his learning and probity is qualified to be followed in all points of religious practice and Islamic law by the generality of Shi'is. He died in Kazimain, Iraq in 1937 leaving three children: Isma'il, Mohammad Baqir as-Sadr (d. 1980) and Aminah (known as Bint al-Hoda).

See also
Ismail al-Sadr
Bint al-Huda
Sadr al-Din al-Sadr
Musa al-Sadr
Muhammad Baqir al-Sadr
Muhammad Sadiq al-Sadr
Muhammad Muhammad Sadiq al-Sadr
List of Shi'a Muslim scholars of Islam

External links
Imam Moussa as-Sadr Website

Iraqi Shia clerics
Iraqi ayatollahs
People from Samarra
Iraqi Shia Muslims
1891 births
1937 deaths
Al-Moussawi family